Arnoldo Granella (1 April 1939 – 23 February 2022) was a French footballer who played as a forward.

Biography
Granella played his career in France for Le Havre AC, Girondins de Bordeaux, and OGC Nice. He played 26 matches in Division 1 and 14 matches in Division 2. On 19 November 1961, he scored twice in one match for Le Havre against Toulouse FC. On 11 October 1964, he scored twice in a Division two match against US Forbach. Granella died on 23 February 2022, at the age of 82.

Honours
Genoa
 Cup of the Alps: 1962

Nice
 French Division 2: 1964–65

References

1939 births
2022 deaths
French people of Italian descent
Sportspeople from Alpes-Maritimes
French footballers
Association football forwards
Ligue 1 players
Ligue 2 players
Le Havre AC players
Genoa C.F.C. players
FC Girondins de Bordeaux players
OGC Nice players
Footballers from Provence-Alpes-Côte d'Azur